Neuton Sérgio Piccoli (born 14 March 1990), simply known as Neuton, is a Brazilian footballer who plays for Ypiranga. Mainly a central defender, he can also play as a left back.

Club career

Grêmio
Born in Erechim, Rio Grande do Sul, Neuton joined Gremio's youth setup in 2008, after starting it out at Ypiranga de Erechim. He made his debut for the club on 25 April 2010, playing the full 90 minutes in a 2–0 away victory over Internacional for the Campeonato Gaúcho championship.

Neuton made his Série A debut on 8 May, starting in a 0–0 draw at Atlético Goianiense. He scored his first professional goal on 20 November, netting the first in a 3–1 home win against Atlético Paranaense.

Udinese
On 28 July 2011, Neuton joined Serie A side Udinese on a five-year contract. He made his debut for the club on 16 August, starting in a 0–1 loss to Arsenal in that season's UEFA Champions League.

Neuton made his league debut, on 11 September 2011, coming on as a late substitute in a 2–0 win over Lecce. However, he only appeared in four league games during the campaign.

Watford (loan)
Neuton joined Watford on a season's loan on 31 August 2012. He made his debut in a 2–1 defeat at Bolton Wanderers on 15 September. He subsequently stated that he "can do much better" in October, but still appeared in only eight league games in the season.

Chapecoense (loan)
On 2 April 2014 Neuton joined newly promoted side Chapecoense on loan until December. Mainly a backup to Douglas Grolli and Jailton, he was only utilized in nine matches before being released in November.

Granada / Albacete (loans)
On 31 August 2015 Neuton was loaned to La Liga side Granada CF, for one year. On 1 February of the following year, after making no league appearances, he joined Albacete Balompié on loan until June.

Later years
In September 2016, Neuton signed with Italian third-tier club Pistoiese. On 31 August 2017, he switched clubs and countries and moved to Cypriot club Doxa Katokopias. On 5 April 2018, he returned to his native country and signed with second-tier club Juventude.

Career statistics

Honours
Grêmio
Campeonato Gaúcho: 2010

References

External links

1990 births
Living people
People from Erechim
Brazilian footballers
Brazilian expatriate footballers
Association football defenders
Grêmio Foot-Ball Porto Alegrense players
Associação Chapecoense de Futebol players
Udinese Calcio players
Watford F.C. players
Granada CF footballers
Albacete Balompié players
U.S. Pistoiese 1921 players
Doxa Katokopias FC players
Esporte Clube Juventude players
Esporte Clube Novo Hamburgo players
Londrina Esporte Clube players
Botafogo Futebol Clube (PB) players
Ypiranga Futebol Clube players
Cypriot First Division players
Campeonato Brasileiro Série C players
Campeonato Brasileiro Série B players
Campeonato Brasileiro Série A players
English Football League players
Serie A players
Serie C players
Expatriate footballers in Italy
Expatriate footballers in England
Expatriate footballers in Spain
Expatriate footballers in Cyprus
Brazilian expatriate sportspeople in Italy
Brazilian expatriate sportspeople in England
Brazilian expatriate sportspeople in Spain
Brazilian expatriate sportspeople in Cyprus
Sportspeople from Rio Grande do Sul